The 1967 Air Force Falcons football team represented the United States Air Force Academy as an independent during the 1967 NCAA University Division football season. Led by tenth-year head coach Ben Martin, the Falcons compiled a record of 2–6–2 and were outscored by their opponents 173–86. Air Force played their home games at Falcon Stadium in Colorado Springs, Colorado.

Schedule

References

Air Force
Air Force Falcons football seasons
Air Force Falcons football